Acetoin dehydrogenase (acetoin dehydrogenase complex, acetoin dehydrogenase enzyme system, AoDH ES) is an enzyme with systematic name acetyl-CoA:acetoin O-acetyltransferase. This enzyme catalyses the following chemical reaction

 acetoin + CoA + NAD+  acetaldehyde + acetyl-CoA + NADH + H+

This enzyme requires thiamine diphosphate.

See also 
 Diacetyl reductase

References

External links 
 

EC 2.3.1